The Battle of Newtown (August 29, 1779) was the only major battle of the Sullivan Expedition, an armed offensive led by Major General John Sullivan that was ordered by George Washington to end the threat of the Iroquois who had sided with the British in the American Revolutionary War. Opposing Sullivan's four brigades were 250 Loyalist soldiers from Butler's Rangers, commanded by Major John Butler, and 350 Iroquois and Munsee Delaware. Butler and Mohawk war leader Joseph Brant did not want to make a stand at Newtown, and instead proposed to harass the enemy on the march, but were overruled by Sayenqueraghta and other indigenous war leaders.

This battle, which was the most significant military engagement of the campaign, took place at the foot of a hill along the Chemung River just outside what is now Elmira, New York.

Terrain
The engagement occurred along a tall hill, now called Sullivan Hill and part of the Newtown Battlefield State Park. The slope of the hill was covered with pine and dense growth of shrub oak. Hoffman Hollow, a marshy area of small hillocks and thick stands of trees, was just to the east of the hill. A small watercourse, called Baldwin Creek, ran through the hollow and emptied into the Chemung River (referred to as the Cayuga branch in Sullivan's reports). The creek followed the hill northwest on the opposite side from the river and had steep western banks.

Iroquois and British Preparation

In May 1779, in response to rumours of a planned American invasion of Iroquois territory, Butler, accompanied by five companies of Butler's Rangers and a detachment of the 8th Regiment of Foot, left Fort Niagara and established a forward operating base at Kanadaseaga located near the northern end of Seneca Lake. In the middle of August, Butler accompanied by about 300 Seneca and Cayuga warriors led by Sayenqueraghta, Cornplanter, and Fish Carrier moved south to the Chemung River where they were joined by Joseph Brant and Brant's Volunteers, as well as a number of Delaware. 

Butler and Brant suggested that, because of the size and composition of Sullivan's forces, harassment raids would be more effective than making a stand. They were overruled by Sayenqueraghta, Cornplanter and the Delaware who selected a position on the north side of the Chemung River for an ambush.

The Rangers and their native allies hastily constructed a horseshoe-shaped camouflaged breastwork of logs about 150 feet up the southeast spur of the hill, within musket range of the road. The hill was used as both an observation point and a barrier to the approach of the Continental Army.

Expedition and battle
On August 26, 1779, Sullivan left Fort Sullivan, where the two columns of his army had converged, with an estimated 3200 well-armed troops. They marched slowly up the Chemung River with the intention of destroying the towns and crops of the Six Nations in central New York. Mid-morning on Sunday, August 29, about ten miles upriver from Fort Sullivan, the advance guard, three companies of riflemen formerly with the Provisional Rifle Corps of Col. Daniel Morgan, drew close to Butler's position. Suspecting an ambush, they halted and scouted the area. Between eleven and eleven-thirty they discovered the hidden breastwork and immediately notified Brigadier General Edward Hand. Hand dispatched his light infantry to take up firing positions behind the bank of Baldwin Creek. The defenders made several unsuccessful attempts at luring the Continentals into an ambush. As the extended army continued to arrive and assemble, Sullivan called a council of war with his brigade commanders. Together they devised a plan of attack.

The 1st New Jersey Regiment, commanded by Colonel Matthias Ogden, was detached from Brigadier General William Maxwell's New Jersey Brigade and sent west along the Chemung River to execute a flanking maneuver on Major Butler's forces. Similarly, the New York Brigade of Brigadier General James Clinton and the New Hampshire Brigade of Brigadier General Enoch Poor were dispatched together eastward, along a circuitous route through Hoffman Hollow, with the mission of approaching the hill's eastern flank and then facing left in preparation for a full ahead assault upon the enemy. Meanwhile, the unified forces of Sullivan's Pennsylvania and New Jersey brigades remained behind at the ready, bolstered by a provisional regiment composed of all the light infantry companies in the expedition. At the end of the first hour, the artillery of six three pounders, two howitzers, and a cohorn posted on a rise near the road, would open fire on the breastwork. These guns would signal General Hand to feint an attack upon the center of the horseshoe, at which time the brigades to the east would swing inward, assault the summit of the hill and turn their attack to the left and rear of the breastwork. When the guns of Poor's and Clinton's attack were heard by Hand, his brigade would storm the works, supported by Maxwell's brigade, putting the defenders in a crossfire.

The plan was complex and conceived on short notice but the ultimate result was a defeat for Butler's Rangers and their indigenous allies. Crossing the swampy marsh (which Sullivan termed a "morass") in Hoffman Hollow slowed the advance of Poor's and Clinton's brigades, disrupting the timing of the plan, and this provided just enough delay to allow Butler and the Iroquois to escape. The artillery barrage opened well before Poor and Clinton were in position which forced the Rangers and Iroquois back from the breastwork before they could be encircled. While some of the defenders turned and ran, the main body of Butler's forces skirmished with the Americans as they withdrew.

Nearly all of the Continentals' casualties occurred in the attack of Lieutenant Colonel George Reid's 2nd New Hampshire Regiment. Assigned to the extreme left of Poor's assault formation, it climbed where the slope was steepest and lagged considerably behind the rest of the brigade. Joseph Brant led a counterattack of indigenous warriors and nearly encircled Reid. The next regiment in line, the 3rd New Hampshire Regiment of 28-year-old Lieutenant Colonel Henry Dearborn, about-faced, fired two volleys and attacked down the hill. Clinton, whose brigade was climbing the hill below and slightly to the right of Poor, sent his 3rd and 5th New York Regiments to help, and the counterattack was crushed.

After razing two Munsee Delaware villages and destroying all crops in the vicinity, Sullivan's army turned north against a demoralized opposition and over the next three weeks destroyed numerous abandoned Seneca and Cayuga villages.

American novelist Allan W. Eckert wrote:
The Battle of Newtown had certainly not been a bloody battle compared to others, but it was most certainly a significant one. This was the battle that broke the back of the Iroquois League...and the hearts of the people of the Six Nations.

Sullivan's Casualties

Sources differ as to the number of American casualties. Captain James Norris of the 3rd New Hampshire recorded three dead and 36 wounded during the battle. In his report to George Washington, General Sullivan also reported three dead but increased the number of wounded to 39. Five of the wounded died from their wounds within three weeks of the battle bringing the total to eight dead.

Dead:
Lieutenant Nathaniel McCauley (died August 30 following amputation of his leg)
Private Abner Dearborn (nephew of Lieutenant Colonel Henry Dearborn died September 2)
Sergeant Demeret and Corporal Hunter 
Josiah Mitchell, Sylvester Williams and two other privates.

Wounded:
Major Benjamin Titcomb
Capt. Elijah Clayes (died November 30, 1779)

Sgt. Oliver Thurston
28 additional wounded

Iroquois and British Casualties

Major Butler reported five of his Rangers killed or taken and three wounded as well as five killed and nine wounded among the Iroquois. American sources reported two prisoners taken, and twelve dead natives including a woman.

Legacy
In 1973 the Newtown Battlefield National Historic Landmark was established by the federal government, recognizing its significant history.

In an effort to incorporate the Newtown Battlefield site into the National Park System, Congressional resolution H.R. 6866, which directed Secretary of the Interior Dirk Kempthorne to conduct a special resource study to evaluate the significance of the Newtown Battlefield and the suitability and feasibility of its inclusion in the National Parks System, was put forth for consideration by Congressman Randy Kuhl. The bill stalled in January 2009 after being referred to the Subcommittee on National Parks, Forests and Public Lands.

Today, the site of the battle is the Wellsburg exit of Interstate 86 and New York State Route 17. Several roadside signs in the vicinity of the interchange mark various troop locations. A tall monument now stands in Newtown Battlefield State Park on a hillside overlooking the interchange near the position taken by Clinton and Poor's brigades.

References

External links
Journals of Major General John Sullivan's Expedition online
Newtown Battlefield Reservation State Park

1779 in the United States
Newtown
Newtown 1779
Newtown 1779
Newtown 1779
Newtown 1779
Chemung County, New York
Newtown 1779
Newtown
1779 in New York (state)